"Funky Drummer" is a single released by James Brown in 1970. Its drum break, improvised by Clyde Stubblefield, is one of the most frequently sampled music recordings.

Recording and composition 
"Funky Drummer" was recorded on November 20, 1969 in Cincinnati, Ohio. It takes the form of an extended vamp, with individual instruments (mostly the guitar, tenor saxophones and organ) improvising brief licks on top. Brown's ad-libbed vocals are sporadic and declamatory, and are mostly concerned with encouraging the other band members. The song is played in the key of D minor, though the first verse is in C major.

As in the full-length version of "Cold Sweat", Brown announces the upcoming drum break, which comes late in the recording, with a request to "give the drummer some." He tells Stubblefield "You don't have to do no soloing, brother, just keep what you got... Don't turn it loose, 'cause it's a mother." Stubblefield's eight-bar unaccompanied "solo", a version of the riff he plays through most of the piece, is the result of Brown's directions; this break beat is one of the most sampled recordings in music.

After the drum break, the band returns to the original vamp. Brown, apparently impressed with what Stubblefield has produced, seems to name the song on the spot as it continues, and repeats it: "The name of this tune is 'The Funky Drummer', 'The Funky Drummer', 'The Funky Drummer'." The recording ends with a reprise of Stubblefield's solo and a fade-out.

Release
"Funky Drummer" was originally released by King Records as a two-part 45 rpm single in March 1970. The difference between the album version and the single version is that the single version contains Brown's vocal percussion ('kooncha'). Despite rising to No. 20 on the R&B chart and No. 51 on the pop chart, it did not receive an album release until the 1986 compilation In the Jungle Groove.

More than one mix of "Funky Drummer" was made around the time it was recorded, including one with tambourine and another with vocal percussion by Brown and trombonist Fred Wesley; the most commonly heard version of the track lacks these elements, which were apparently overdubbed. In addition to the original version of "Funky Drummer", the album In the Jungle Groove includes a "bonus beat reprise" of the piece. This track, edited by Danny Krivit, consists of a 3-minute loop of the drum break, punctuated only by Brown's sampled vocal interjections and an occasional guitar chord and tambourine hit.

Sampling
"Funky Drummer" is one of the most widely sampled pieces of music. In 1986, the tracks "South Bronx", "Eric B. is President" and "It's a Demo" sampled Stubblefield's drum break, helping popularize sampling. The drum break was sampled by hip hop acts including Public Enemy, N.W.A, LL Cool J, Run-DMC and the Beastie Boys, and later pop musicians such as Ed Sheeran and George Michael.

As Stubblefield did not receive a songwriter credit for "Funky Drummer", he received no royalties for the sampling. He told The New York Times in 2011: "It didn't bug me or disturb me, but I think it's disrespectful not to pay people for what they use." Stubblefield capitalized on the name with his 1997 album Revenge of the Funky Drummer.

Personnel
James Brown – vocals, Hammond organ

with the James Brown Orchestra
Richard "Kush" Griffith – trumpet
Joe Davis – trumpet
Fred Wesley – trombone
Maceo Parker – tenor saxophone
Eldee Williams – tenor saxophone
St. Clair Pinckney – baritone saxophone
Jimmy Nolen – guitar
Alphonso "Country" Kellum – guitar
Charles Sherrell – bass guitar
Clyde Stubblefield – drums

Chart positions

See also
 Amen break
 "Think (About It)"
 Woo! Yeah!
 "Funky President (People It's Bad)"

References

External links
 [ Allmusic review]
 List of songs that sample "Funky Drummer" (the-breaks.com) 
 Samples of "Funky Drummer" by James Brown (whosampled.com)

Songs about musicians
Songs about drums
1970 singles
Sampled drum breaks
1970s instrumentals
James Brown songs
Songs written by James Brown
1969 songs
King Records (United States) singles